The Chinese Martyrs Catholic Church is a national Catholic church in the Greater Toronto Area for Chinese Catholics. Originally based in Scarborough and now based in Markham, it was the second Catholic church to cater to Chinese Catholics in the GTA. The church is named for the Chinese Martyrs, 120 Chinese and foreign missionaries and laypeople who died in China during the 19th and 20th centuries.

See also
St. Michael's Cathedral, Toronto
St. Paul's Basilica
St. Patrick's Church (Toronto)
Our Lady of Lourdes Roman Catholic Church (Toronto)

Other Chinese Catholic churches in the Greater Toronto Area
St. Agnes Kouying Tsao Catholic Church
Our Lady of Mount Carmel Chinese Catholic Church
Saviour of the World Chinese Catholic Church

External links

Official website of the Chinese Martyrs Catholic Church

Buildings and structures in Markham, Ontario
Roman Catholic churches in Ontario
Roman Catholic Archdiocese of Toronto